In botany, a pedicel is a stem that attaches a single flower to the  inflorescence. Such inflorescences are described as pedicellate.

Description 

Pedicel refers to a structure connecting a single flower to its inflorescence. In the absence of a pedicel, the flowers are described as sessile. Pedicel is also applied to the stem of the infructescence. The word "pedicel" is derived from the Latin pediculus, meaning "little foot".  The stem or branch from the main stem of the inflorescence that holds a group of pedicels is called a peduncle. A pedicel may be associated with a bract or bracts.

In cultivation 

In Halloween types of pumpkin or squash plants, the shape of the pedicel has received particular attention because plant breeders are trying to optimize the size and shape of the pedicel for the best "lid" for a "jack-o'-lantern".

Gallery

See also

 Sessile
 Scape

References

Bibliography 

  

Plant morphology
+